Unomattina (also spelled Uno Mattina) is a long-running Italian morning television show, broadcast by Rai 1 since 22 December 1986.

History 
The first-morning program of the Italian national public television, was created to counterprogram the successful morning schedule of Fininvest. Its contents include news, weather forecasts, interviews, and talk show segments. The first edition was presented by Elisabetta Gardini and Piero Badaloni, with the segments set in Milan studios hosted by Alessandro Cecchi Paone and Sabina Ciuffini. In the subsequent season's various presenters alternated, including Luca Giurato, Livia Azzariti, Antonella Clerici, Maria Teresa Ruta, Franco Di Mare, Elisa Isoardi, Michele Cucuzza, Paola Saluzzi, Roberta Capua, Caterina Balivo, Eleonora Daniele. Since 1992 the program has a summer spin-off called Unomattina Estate.

References

Further reading
 Joseph Baroni. "Umomattina". Dizionario della Televisione. Raffaello Cortina Editore. .

External links

Italian television shows
RAI original programming
1986 Italian television series debuts
1980s Italian television series
1990s Italian television series
2000s Italian television series
2010s Italian television series
2020s Italian television series